Fort Street Presbyterian Church may refer to:

Fort Street Presbyterian Church (Detroit, Michigan), listed on the National Register of Historic Places in Wayne County, Michigan
Fort Street Presbyterian Church (San Marcos, Texas), listed on the National Register of Historic Places in Hays County, Texas

See also
 Fort Street (disambiguation)